Hugh Campbell (born May 21, 1941) is a former American football and Canadian football player, coach, and executive.  He served as a head coach in three different professional gridiron football leagues: the Canadian Football League (CFL), the United States Football League (USFL) and the National Football League (NFL).  Campbell retired as the CEO of the Edmonton Eskimos of the CFL in 2006.  He was inducted into the Canadian Football Hall of Fame in 2000.

College career
Campbell played wide receiver at Washington State University from 1959 to 1962. During that time he appeared in the Hula Bowl, the College All-Star game, the Coaches All-America game, and the East-West Shrine Bowl.  Campbell received most outstanding player honours in the Coaches and the Shrine Bowl games.  He was also awarded the 1961 W. J. Voit Memorial Trophy as the outstanding football player on the Pacific Coast. During his Cougar career he was teamed with fellow CFL Hall of Famer George Reed.

Professional playing career
Campbell joined the Saskatchewan Roughriders in 1963 and "Gluey Hughy", as he became known, was a key element of their Grey Cup winning team in 1966.  Campbell quit the Roughriders in 1968 to take a position as assistant coach at Washington State but returned for a final year with the Roughriders in 1969. In his six CFL seasons, Campbell caught 321 passes for an average gain of 16.9 yards per reception and scored 60 touchdowns, including 17 TD receptions in 1966.  Campbell received western conference all-star honours as a flanker in 1964, 1965, 1966 and 1969.  He was a CFL all-star in 1965 and 1966.

Coaching and administrative career
Campbell retired as an active player after the 1969 season to take up a head coaching job with Whitworth College in Spokane, Washington.  During his seven-year tenure, Campbell revived the moribund Pirates football program and was named conference coach of the year three times.

In 1977, Campbell was named head coach of the Edmonton Eskimos, where he took the Eskimos to the Grey Cup game in Montreal that first year but lost 41-6 in a major blowout on an icy field against the Montreal Alouettes.  It was the last Grey Cup championship game coach Campbell would lose as the Eskimos won the next five Grey Cup games, from 1978 through 1982, an all-time CFL consecutive games win record. 

Following the 1982 season, Campbell left the CFL to become head coach of the USFL's Los Angeles Express. 

After one season, the Houston Oilers, who were bidding for the services of Warren Moon, hired him to become their head coach and help improve their chances of signing the coveted free agent (the Oilers ultimately signed Moon). He served as head coach of the Oilers for the 1984 and 1985 seasons, being fired by the Oilers with two games left to go in the 1985 season. 

In 1986, he returned to the Eskimos as the team's general manager. 

After 20 years as the head of the Eskimos organization, Campbell announced his retirement effective at the end of 2006.

Personal
Campbell and his wife Louise have four children, daughters Molly, Jill and Robin and son, Rick, who is the current head coach of the BC Lions.

Head coaching record

CFL, USFL, and NFL

References

1941 births
Living people
American football quarterbacks
Canadian Football Hall of Fame inductees
Canadian football wide receivers
Edmonton Elks coaches
Edmonton Elks general managers
Houston Oilers head coaches
People from Saratoga, California
Saskatchewan Roughriders players
Sportspeople from Santa Clara County, California
United States Football League coaches
Washington State Cougars football players
Whitworth Pirates football coaches
Players of American football from California